Have a Little Faith is a Christmas album by Beverley Mahood released in 2006.

Track listing
intro "Have a Little Faith" (J. Hiatt)
"Hark the Herald Angels Sing/Angels We Heard On High" (with Lace) (C. Wesley) - 6:26
"Have Yourself a Merry Little Christmas (R. Blane, H. Martin) - 4:33
"God Rest Ye Merry Gentlemen (Traditional) - 3:28
"Joy to the World" (Traditional) - 3:28
 "Luke" (Mahood, R. Hutt, Luke 2-14) - 4:39
"O Come All Ye Faithful  (with Lace and Jason Barry) (Traditional) - 3:11
"All through the Night" (H. Bolton, Traditional) - 3:05
"Do You Hear What I Hear" (N. Regney, G. Shayne) - 4:26
"Winter Wonderland" (with Lace) (F. Bernard, R. Smith) - 4:07
"Christmas Lullaby" (C. Eaton, A. Grant) - 3:16

Beverley Mahood albums
2006 Christmas albums
Country Christmas albums